Sean Hogan is a Canadian country music singer-songwriter.

Biography
Born in Sarnia, Ontario, Hogan attended Fanshawe College in London, Ontario, studying music. In 2003 he won the Roots Artist of the Year at the Canadian Country Music Awards and he has also won the Independent Male Artist of the Year award in 1997. Hogan engages in charity work and in 2005 the Saskatchewan Country Music Association named him Humanitarian of the Year.

Discography

Albums

Singles

1996–2000

2001–present

Notes
A^ Featuring Gord Bamford, Duane Steele, Jake Mathews, Diane Chase, Jamie Warren, Brad Johner, Lisa Hewitt, Colin Amey, Val LeRoy and Tracey James.
B^ Featuring Beverley Mahood, Patricia Conroy, Bobby Wills, Amber Marshall, Wildflower, Angela Harris, Shane Yellowbird, Jake Mathews, Jamie Warren, Tenille, Pear and Leonard Bearshirt & Spirit Horse.

Guest singles

Music videos

References

External links
 Sean Hogan's Webpage
 Sean Hogan's MySpace Page
 Sean Hogan's YouTube Page
 Sean Hogan's Canadian Country Christmas

Canadian male singer-songwriters
Canadian country singer-songwriters
Living people
Fanshawe College alumni
People from Sarnia
Year of birth missing (living people)
Musicians from Ontario